Estramustine is an estrogen and cytostatic antineoplastic agent which was never marketed. It is an estrogen ester – specifically, the C3 normustine ester of estradiol – and acts in part as a prodrug of estradiol in the body. Estramustine phosphate, the C17β phosphate ester of estramustine and a prodrug of estramustine, estromustine, estradiol, and estrone, is marketed and used in the treatment of prostate cancer.

See also
 List of hormonal cytostatic antineoplastic agents
 List of estrogen esters § Estradiol esters

References

Abandoned drugs
Antiandrogens
Antigonadotropins
Antineoplastic drugs
Carbamates
Chloroethyl compounds
Secondary alcohols
Estradiol esters
Estranes
Estrogens
Hormonal antineoplastic drugs
Human drug metabolites
Mitotic inhibitors
Nitrogen mustards
Organochlorides